Codrington is a town located on the island of Barbuda, which is part of the country of Antigua and Barbuda. For travelers and visitors, Codrington is served by Barbuda Codrington Airport.

History 
Codrington was founded by Christopher Codrington and his brother John in 1685, to be the main residential centre on the island. They built a castle which dominated the town, but it was badly damaged by an earthquake in 1843 and little trace of it now remains. It had a population of 914 in 2001.

In 1741, the first slave rebellion happened in Codrington. Beach's Rebellion arose as a consequence of manager Thomas Beach's "cruel and tyrannical" behaviour. Several herds of cattle were slaughtered, with additional damage being done to the Codrington's property and equipment.

The population of Codrington was recorded as 700 in the census of 1904, and 1,252 in the census of 1991. The town, along with the rest of the island, was completely evacuated in September 2017 following catastrophic damage caused by Hurricane Irma, but much of the population has now returned to the island.

Hurricane Irma
On 6 September 2017, Hurricane Irma, at Category 5, swept through the town. Prime Minister Gaston Browne stated that there had been damage to 95% of the structures on the small island and that he was "of the view that the island [Barbuda] is barely habitable". As of October 2017 residents were coming back to Codrington and beginning the effort to rebuild.

Demographics (2011)
The town has a Living Condition Index (unmet basic needs index) of 14.05 and an unemployment rate of 6.58. The Antigua & Barbuda Statistics Department classifies the city as "Urban".

There are three Enumeration Districts "EDs".

 Codrington (North) (ED 90100)

 Codrington (Central) (ED 90200)
 Codrington (South) (ED 90300)

References

External links
Museum of Antigua and Barbuda

Populated places in Antigua and Barbuda
Codrington
Populated places established in 1685
1680s establishments in the Caribbean
1685 establishments in the British Empire
1685 establishments in North America